Radical 16 or radical table (几部), meaning small table, is one of 23 of the 214  Kangxi radicals that are composed of 2 strokes.

 is also the 16th indexing component in the Table of Indexing Chinese Character Components predominantly adopted by Simplified Chinese dictionaries published in mainland China.  is an associated indexing component affiliated to the principal component . In addition, the identical character  used in Simplified Chinese for  jǐ used to ask "how many" for small amounts or to mean "a few, some, almost, nearly" does not have any historical connection to the "table" character.

Evolution

Derived characters

Literature 

Leyi Li: “Tracing the Roots of Chinese Characters: 500 Cases”. Beijing 1993, 
 KangXi:  page 133, character 16

External links

Unihan Database - U+51E0

016
016